The 2022 Chicago White Sox season was the club's 123rd season in Chicago, their 122nd in the American League and their 32nd at Guaranteed Rate Field.

On December 2, 2021, Commissioner of Baseball Rob Manfred announced a lockout of players, following expiration of the collective bargaining agreement (CBA) between the league and the Major League Baseball Players Association (MLBPA). On March 10, 2022, the MLB and MLBPA agreed to a new collective bargaining agreement, thus ending the lockout. Opening Day was played on April 7. Although MLB previously announced that several series would be cancelled due to the lockout, the agreement provided for a 162-game season, with originally canceled games to be made up via doubleheaders.

The White Sox failed to repeat as division champions and finished in 2nd in the AL Central with a record of .500 at 81–81.

Offseason

Lockout 

The expiration of the league's collective bargaining agreement (CBA) with the Major League Baseball Players Association occurred on December 1, 2021, with no new agreement in place. As a result, the team owners voted unanimously to lockout the players stopping all free agency and trades.

The parties came to an agreement on a new CBA on March 10, 2022. The scheduled 162-game regular season was agreed to be played in its entirety, with no games cancelled. However, the delayed start to spring training meant that the regular season was postponed from its original March 31 Opening Day to April 7. For the White Sox, this meant that six games scheduled between March 31 and April 6 were moved to a later date: a three-game home series with the Minnesota Twins that was rescheduled for October 3 through October 5, and a three-game road series with the Kansas City Royals that was made up on three separate dates (May 17, August 10, and August 22nd).

Rule changes 
Pursuant to the new CBA, several new rules were instituted for the 2022 season. The National League adopted the designated hitter full-time, a draft lottery was implemented, the postseason expanded from ten teams to twelve, and advertising patches was allowed to appear on player uniforms and helmets for the first time.

Transactions
November 30, 2021: Pitcher Kendall Graveman signed a 3-year, $24M contract.
December 1, 2021: Utility player Leury García signed a 3-year, $16.5M contract extension.
January 26, 2022: Cuban outfielder Oscar Colas agreed to a contract with the White Sox that included a $2.7 million signing bonus.
March 14, 2022: White Sox sign pitcher Joe Kelly to a 2-year, $17M contract as well as pitcher Vince Velasquez to a one-year, $3M contract.
March 15, 2022: Second baseman Josh Harrison signed a one-year, $5.5M contract.
April 1, 2022: White Sox trade pitcher Craig Kimbrel to the Los Angeles Dodgers for outfielder A. J. Pollock.
April 3, 2022: White Sox trade catcher Zack Collins to the Toronto Blue Jays for catcher Reese McGuire
April 5, 2022: White Sox sign pitcher Johnny Cueto to a 1-year, $4.2 million minor-league deal.

Roster

Regular season

American League Central

American League Wild Card

Records vs. Opponents

Detailed Records

Notable Transactions 

 May 28, 2022: White Sox designated pitcher Dallas Keuchel for assignment.
 June 12, 2022: As part of a series of roster moves that included the selecting of catcher Seby Zavala's contract, White Sox designated infielder Yermín Mercedes for assignment.
 August 1, 2022: White Sox trade catcher Reese McGuire to the Boston Red Sox for pitcher Jake Diekman.
 August 18, 2022: White Sox sign shortstop Elvis Andrus.

Achievements 

 On April 13, Dallas Keuchel earned his 100th career win in the major leagues as a result of the White Sox's 6–4 victory over the Seattle Mariners. Keuchel pitched five innings in the ball game, giving up six hits and three earned runs while striking out five batters.
 On June 27, Tim Anderson recorded his 100th career stolen base during the team's 4–3 loss to the Los Angeles Angels.
 Josh Harrison recorded his 1000th career hit during the team's 8–2 loss to the Minnesota Twins on July 5. During the game, he also became the first major league ballplayer in history to pitch on the same day he had his 1000th career hit, throwing a scoreless ninth inning in relief.
 The White Sox had two players selected to the 2022 MLB All-Star Game in Dodger Stadium: shortstop Tim Anderson, who started for the American League and went 1-for-2 with a single in the fourth inning, and closer Liam Hendriks, who pitched a third-of-an-inning of relief in the eighth inning. Both players also participated in the prior season's All-Star Game, making them the first White Sox teammates to play together in two consecutive "Midsummer Classics" since Mark Buehrle and Paul Konerko did it in 2005 and 2006.
 On August 6, Liam Hendriks became the first Australian-born reliever to throw 100 career saves, tossing a scoreless ninth inning against the Texas Rangers to secure the team's 2–1 victory in that night's ballgame.
 Beginning with his May 29 start against the Chicago Cubs, Dylan Cease went on a historic stretch in which he had 14 consecutive starts giving up 1 or fewer earned runs. That was the first time ever a starting pitcher went on such a streak since the earned run became a statistic in 1913, breaking the previous mark of 13 consecutive starts set by Jacob deGrom in 2021. Cease's streak was finally broken on August 16 against the Houston Astros, in which he gave up 3 earned runs on six hits in five innings of work.
 Yoán Moncada became the first player in American League history to have 5 or more hits and 5 or more RBIs in a game twice in the same season. The first game occurred June 15 at the Detroit Tigers (5-for-6 with 1 home run and 5 RBIs), while the second game occurred September 8 at the Oakland Athletics (5-for-6 with 2 home runs and 5 RBIs).

Tony La Russa Medical Leave 
Just before the White Sox were set to face off against the Kansas City Royals on August 30, it was announced by the team that manager Tony La Russa had to miss the game under the direction of his doctors, in order to get further medical testing. The team's bench coach, Miguel Cairo, took over for La Russa as acting manager. It was later revealed that La Russa had a pacemaker installed and had to undergo a procedure to avoid any further health complications. Though there was some speculation as to La Russa returning to the dugout by late September, the White Sox officially put any rumors to rest on September 24 when they announced that he would miss the remainder of the 2022 season. La Russa's doctors never gave him permission to return to managing, though he was given permission to travel with the White Sox to Oakland on September 11 for the Athletics' jersey retirement ceremony of former pitcher Dave Stewart, who La Russa managed for several seasons.

Prior to La Russa's departure from the White Sox, the team's record was an underachieving 63-65 and they were five games behind the Cleveland Guardians for first place in the American League Central. At the start of Cairo's role as acting manager, the White Sox went on an initial hot streak, winning 10 of 13 games and climbing to as close as 1.5 games back of Cleveland on September 8. However, the late-season resurgence did not last long. Beginning on September 11, the White Sox would lose 11 of 15 games, including getting swept by the Guardians in a pivotal three-game home series from September 20–22. The Guardians would officially clinch the American League Central on September 25, ending the White Sox's dreams of repeating as division champions. The White Sox were officially eliminated from the playoffs on September 28 after a loss against the Twins which was their 8th straight loss.

Game log

 
|- style="background:#fbb;" 
| 1 || April 8 || @ Tigers || 12:10pm || 4–5 || Soto (1–0) || Hendriks (0–1) || — || 43,480 || 0–1 || L1
|- style="background:#bfb;" 
| 2 || April 9 || @ Tigers || 12:10pm || 5–2 || Cease (1–0) || Mize (0–1) || Bummer (1) || 17,469 || 1–1 || W1
|- style="background:#bfb;" 
| 3 || April 10 || @ Tigers || 12:10pm || 10–1 || Crick (1–0) || Skubal (0–1) || — || 15,712 || 2–1 || W2
|- style="background:#bfb;" 
| 4 || April 12 || Mariners || 3:10pm || 3–2 || López (1–0) || Brash (0–1) || Hendriks (1) || 36,948 || 3–1 || W3
|- style="background:#bfb;" 
| 5 || April 13 || Mariners || 6:10pm || 6–4 || Keuchel (1–0) || Ray (1–1) || Hendriks (2) || 12,291 || 4–1 || W4
|- style="background:#fbb;"
| 6 || April 14 || Mariners || 1:10pm || 1–5 || Gilbert (1–0) || Lambert (0–1) || — || 13,391 || 4–2 || L1
|- style="background:#bfb;" 
| 7 || April 15 || Rays || 6:10pm || 3–2 || Cease (2–0) || Rasmussen (0–1) || Hendriks (3) || 19,009 || 5–2 || W1
|- style="background:#bfb;" 
| 8 || April 16 || Rays || 1:10pm || 3–2 || López (2–0) || Thompson (1–1) || Hendriks (4) || 27,113 || 6–2 || W2
|- style="background:#fbb;" 
| 9 || April 17 || Rays || 1:10pm || 3–9 || Mazza (1–0) || Velasquez (0–1) || — || 17,798 || 6–3 || L1
|- style="background:#bbb;" 
| — || April 18 || @ Guardians || 5:10pm || colspan=7 | Postponed (Inclement weather, Makeup July 12)
|- style="background:#bbb;" 
| — || April 19 || @ Guardians || 5:10pm || colspan=7 | Postponed (Inclement weather, Makeup April 20)
|- style="background:#fbb;" 
| 10 || April 20  || @ Guardians || 2:10pm || 1–11 || Bieber (1–0) || Keuchel (1–1) || — ||  || 6–4 || L2
|- style="background:#fbb;" 
| 11 || April 20  || @ Guardians || 4:40pm || 1–2 || Gose (1–0) || Lambert (0–2) || Clase (1) || 9,196 || 6–5 || L3
|- style="background:#fbb;" 
| 12 || April 21 || @ Guardians || 12:10pm || 3–6 || Plesac (1–1) || Cease (2–1) || Clase (2) || 8,345 || 6–6 || L4
|- style="background:#fbb;" 
| 13 || April 22 || @ Twins || 7:10pm || 1–2 || Duffey (1–2) || Graveman (0–1) || Pagán (2) || 14,257 || 6–7 || L5
|- style="background:#fbb;" 
| 14 || April 23 || @ Twins || 3:05pm || 2–9 || Bundy (3–0) || Velasquez (0–2) || — || 16,686 || 6–8 || L6
|- style="background:#fbb;" 
| 15 || April 24 || @ Twins || 1:10pm || 4–6  || Smith (1–0) || Hendriks (0–2) || — || 16,197 || 6–9 || L7
|- style="background:#fbb;" 
| 16 || April 26 || Royals || 6:10pm || 0–6 || Lynch (2–1) || Keuchel (1–2) || — || 12,031 || 6–10 || L8
|- style="background:#bfb;" 
| 17 || April 27 || Royals || 1:10pm || 7–3 || Sousa (1–0) || Snider (2–1) || Graveman (1) || 12,363 || 7–10 || W1
|- style="background:#fbb;" 
| 18 || April 28 || Royals || 1:10pm || 2–5  || Barlow (2–0) || Bummer (0–1) || Clarke (1) || 11,242 || 7–11 || L1
|- style="background:#fbb;" 
| 19 || April 29 || Angels || 6:10pm || 1–5 || Warren (2–0) || Giolito (0–1) || Iglesias (6) || 23,709 || 7–12 || L2
|- style="background:#bfb;" 
| 20 || April 30 || Angels || 3:05pm || 4–0 || Velasquez (1–2) || Suárez (0–2) || — || 33,762 || 8–12 || W1
|-
 
 
|- style="background:#fbb;" 
| 21 || May 1 || Angels || 1:10pm || 5–6 || Lorenzen (3–1) || Keuchel (1–3) || Tepera (1) || 27,664 || 8–13 || L1
|- style="background:#bfb;" 
| 22 || May 2 || Angels || 1:10pm || 3–0 || Cease (3–1) || Sandoval (1–1) || Hendriks (5) || 13,112 || 9–13 || W1
|- style="background:#bfb;" 
| 23 || May 3 || @ Cubs || 6:40pm || 3–1 || López (3–0) || Effross (0–1) || Hendriks (6) || 34,206 || 10–13 || W2
|- style="background:#bfb;" 
| 24 || May 4 || @ Cubs || 6:40pm || 4–3 || Giolito (1–1) || Hendricks (1–3) || Hendriks (7) || 36,755 || 11–13 || W3
|- style="background:#bfb;"  
| 25 || May 6 || @ Red Sox || 6:10pm || 4–2 || Velasquez (2–2) || Eovaldi (1–1) || Hendriks (8) || 30,944 || 12–13 || W4
|- style="background:#bfb;" 
| 26 || May 7 || @ Red Sox || 3:10pm || 3–1  || López (4–0) || Barnes (0–3) || Hendriks (9) || 33,026 || 13–13 || W5
|- style="background:#bfb;"
| 27 || May 8 || @ Red Sox || 10:35am || 3–2 || Keuchel (2–3) || Houck (2–3) || Sousa (1) || 28,602 || 14–13 || W6
|- style="background:#fbb;" 
| 28 || May 9 || Guardians || 7:10pm || 9–12  || Clase (1–2) || Burr (0–1) || Stephan (1) || 17,168 || 14–14 || L1
|- style="background:#bfb;" 
| 29 || May 10 || Guardians || 7:10pm || 4–1 || Giolito (2–1) || Quantrill (1–2) || Graveman (2) || 16,025 || 15–14 || W1
|- style="background:#bbb;"
| — || May 11 || Guardians || 1:10pm || colspan=7 | Postponed (COVID–19 positive tests, Makeup July 23)
|- style="background:#fbb;" 
| 30 || May 12 || Yankees || 7:10pm || 7–15 || Loáisiga (1–1) || Kelly (0–1) || — || 20,050 || 15–15 || L1
|- style="background:#fbb;" 
| 31 || May 13 || Yankees || 7:10pm || 4–10 || Cole (3–0) || Velasquez (2–3) || — || 28,877 || 15–16 || L2
|- style="background:#bfb;" 
| 32 || May 14 || Yankees || 6:10pm || 3–2 || Hendriks (1–2) || Chapman (0–1) || — || 32,830 || 16–16 || W1
|- style="background:#fbb;"
| 33 || May 15 || Yankees || 1:10pm || 1–5 || Cortés Jr. (2–1) || Kopech (0–1) || — || 29,500 || 16–17 || L1
|- style="background:#bfb;" 
| 34 || May 16 || @ Royals || 7:10pm || 5–3  || Burr (1–1) || Barlow (2–1) || Hendriks (10) || 12,441 || 17–17 || W1
|- style="background:#bfb;" 
| 35 || May 17  || @ Royals || 1:10pm || 3–0 || Cease (4–1) || Heasley (0–2) || Hendriks (11) || 9,168 || 18–17 || W2
|- style="background:#fbb;" 
| 36 || May 17  || @ Royals || 6:10pm || 1–2 || Singer (1–0) || Martin (0–1) || Staumont (3) || 11,684 || 18–18 || L1
|- style="background:#fbb;" 
| 37 || May 18 || @ Royals || 7:10pm || 2–6 || Snider (3–1) || López (4–1) || — || 13,504 || 18–19 || L2
|- style="background:#bfb;" 
| 38 || May 19 || @ Royals || 1:10pm || 7–4 || Sousa (2–0) || Speier (0–1) || Hendriks (12) || 11,784 || 19–19 || W1
|- style="background:#bbb;" 
| — || May 20 || @ Yankees || 6:05pm || colspan=7 | Postponed (Inclement weather, Makeup May 22)
|- style="background:#fbb;" 
| 39 || May 21 || @ Yankees || 12:05pm || 5–7 || Cortés Jr. (3–1) || Keuchel (2–4) || Holmes (4) || 44,001 || 19–20 || L1
|- style="background:#bfb;" 
| 40 || May 22  || @ Yankees || 2:05pm || 3–1 || Graveman (1–1) || Chapman (0–2) || Hendriks (13) ||  || 20–20 || W1
|- style="background:#bfb;" 
| 41 || May 22  || @ Yankees || 6:08pm || 5–0 || Kopech (1–1) || Loáisiga (1–2) || — || 36,167 || 21–20 || W2
|- style="background:#fbb;" 
| 42 || May 24 || Red Sox || 7:10pm || 3–16 || Pivetta (3–4) || Cease (4–2) || — || 21,835 || 21–21 || L1
|- style="background:#bfb;" 
| 43 || May 25 || Red Sox || 7:10pm || 3–1 || Giolito (3–1) || Hill (1–2) || Hendriks (14) || 21,075 || 22–21 || W1
|- style="background:#fbb;" 
| 44 || May 26 || Red Sox || 7:10pm || 7–16 || Schreiber (2–0) || Keuchel (2–5) || — || 24,896 || 22–22 || L1
|- style="background:#fbb;" 
| 45 || May 28 || Cubs || 6:15pm || 1–5 || Thompson (5–0) || Cueto (0–1) || — || 37,820 || 22–23 || L2
|- style="background:#bfb;" 
| 46 || May 29 || Cubs || 1:10pm || 5–4  || Foster (1–0) || Gsellman (0–2) || — || 38,080 || 23–23 || W1
|- style="background:#fbb;"
| 47 || May 31 || @ Blue Jays || 6:07pm || 5–6 || Gausman (5–3) || Giolito (3–2) || Romano (16) || 25,424 || 23–24 || L1
|-
 
 
|- style="background:#fbb;" 
| 48 || June 1 || @ Blue Jays || 6:07pm || 3–7 || Stripling (1–1) || Kopech (1–2) || — || 23,312 || 23–25 || L2
|- style="background:#fbb;" 
| 49 || June 2 || @ Blue Jays || 2:07pm || 3–8 || Manoah (6–1) || Cueto (0–2) || — || 25,250 || 23–26 || L3
|- style="background:#fbb;" 
| 50 || June 3 || @ Rays || 6:10pm || 3–6 || McClanahan (6–2) || Martin (0–2) || Poche (3) || 8,930 || 23–27 || L4
|- style="background:#bfb;" 
| 51 || June 4 || @ Rays || 3:10pm || 3–2 || Crick (2–0) || Beeks (1–1) || Hendriks (15) || 19,452 || 24–27 || W1
|- style="background:#bfb;"
| 52 || June 5 || @ Rays || 12:40pm || 6–5 || Giolito (4–2) || Yarbrough (0–3) || Hendriks (16) || 11,162 || 25–27 || W2
|- style="background:#bfb;" 
| 53 || June 7 || Dodgers || 7:10pm || 4–0 || Kopech (2–2) || Bickford (0–1) || — || 25,625 || 26–27 || W3
|- style="background:#fbb;"
| 54 || June 8 || Dodgers || 7:10pm || 1–4 || Gonsolin (7–0) || Cueto (0–3) || Hudson (5) || 25,078 || 26–28 || L1
|- style="background:#fbb;" 
| 55 || June 9 || Dodgers || 1:10pm || 9–11 || Graterol (2–2) || Cease (4–3) || — || 25,482 || 26–29 || L2
|- style="background:#bfb;" 
| 56 || June 10 || Rangers || 7:10pm || 8–3 || Graveman (2–1) || King (1–2) || — || 24,270 || 27–29 || W1
|- style="background:#fbb;"
| 57 || June 11 || Rangers || 1:10pm || 9–11  || Moore (3–0) || Foster (1–1) || — || 30,221 || 27–30 || L1
|- style="background:#fbb;"
| 58 || June 12 || Rangers || 1:10pm || 6–8  || Barlow (2–1) || Foster (1–2) || Allard (1) || 31,096 || 27–31 || L2
|- style="background:#bfb;"
| 59 || June 13 || @ Tigers || 6:10pm || 9–5 || Sousa (3–0) || García (0–2) || — || 16,634 || 28–31 || W1
|- style="background:#bfb;"
| 60 || June 14 || @ Tigers || 6:10pm || 5–1 || Cease (5–3) || Hutchison (0–4) || — || 16,450 || 29–31 || W2
|- style="background:#bfb;"
| 61 || June 15 || @ Tigers || 12:10pm || 13–0 || Martin (1–2) || Faedo (1–3) || — || 20,726 || 30–31 || W3
|- style="background:#fbb;"  
| 62 || June 17 || @ Astros || 7:10pm || 3–13 || Valdez (7–3) || Giolito (4–3) || — || 35,467 || 30–32 || L1
|- style="background:#bfb;" 
| 63 || June 18 || @ Astros || 3:10pm || 7–0 || Cueto (1–3) || Verlander (8–3) || — || 36,747 || 31–32 || W1
|- style="background:#fbb;" 
| 64 || June 19 || @ Astros || 6:08pm || 3–4 || Javier (4–3) || Kopech (2–3) || Pressly (13) || 37,709 || 31–33 || L1
|- style="background:#bfb;" 
| 65 || June 20 || Blue Jays || 7:10pm || 8–7 || Lynn (1–0) || Berríos (5–3) || Kelly (1) || 22,842 || 32–33 || W1
|- style="background:#bfb;" 
| 66 || June 21 || Blue Jays || 7:10pm || 7–6   || Velasquez (3–3) || Gage (0–1) || — || 20,529 || 33–33 || W2
|- style="background:#fbb;" 
| 67 || June 22 || Blue Jays || 1:10pm || 5–9 || Stripling (4–2) || Giolito (4–4) || — || 19,406 || 33–34 || L1
|- style="background:#fbb;"
| 68 || June 23 || Orioles || 7:10pm || 0–4 || Kremer (2–1) || Cueto (1–4) || López (12) || 22,431 || 33–35 || L2
|- style="background:#fbb;" 
| 69 || June 24 || Orioles || 7:10pm || 1–4 || Krehbiel (3–3) || Kopech (2–4) || López (13) || 27,943 || 33–36 || L3
|- style="background:#fbb;" 
| 70 || June 25 || Orioles || 1:10pm || 2–6 || Watkins (1–1) || Lynn (1–1) || — || 29,282 || 33–37 || L4
|- style="background:#bfb;" 
| 71 || June 26 || Orioles || 1:10pm || 4–3 || Cease (6–3) || Lyles (4–7) || Graveman (3) || 29,191 || 34–37 || W1
|- style="background:#fbb;"
| 72 || June 27 || @ Angels || 8:38pm || 3–4 || Syndergaard (5–6) || López (4–2) || Iglesias (14) || 21,973 || 34–38 || L1
|- style="background:#bfb;" 
| 73 || June 28 || @ Angels || 8:38pm || 11–4 || Cueto (2–4) || Ortega (1–3) || — || 23,979 || 35–38 || W1
|- style="background:#fbb;" 
| 74 || June 29 || @ Angels || 8:38pm || 1–4 || Ohtani (7–4) || Kopech (2–5) || Iglesias (15) || 27,612 || 35–39 || L1
|-
 
 
|- style="background:#bfb;" 
| 75 || July 1 || @ Giants || 9:15pm || 1–0 || Banks (1–0) || Doval (2–4) || Graveman (4) || 35,266 || 36–39 || W1
|- style="background:#bfb;" 
| 76 || July 2 || @ Giants || 3:05pm || 5–3 || Cease (7–3) || Webb (7–3) || Graveman (5) || 30,804 || 37–39 || W2
|- style="background:#bfb;" 
| 77 || July 3 || @ Giants || 3:05pm || 13–4 || Giolito (5–4) || Hjelle (0–1) || — || 30,155 || 38–39 || W3
|- style="background:#fbb;" 
| 78 || July 4 || Twins || 7:10pm || 3–6  || Pagán (3–3) || Kelly (0–2) || — || 32,483 || 38–40 || L1
|- style="background:#fbb;" 
| 79 || July 5 || Twins || 7:10pm || 2–8 || Winder (4–2) || Kopech (2–6) || — || 18,566 || 38–41 || L2
|- style="background:#bfb;" 
| 80 || July 6 || Twins || 1:10pm || 9–8  || Ruiz (1–0) || Morán (0–1) || — || 18,393 || 39–41 || W1
|- style="background:#fbb;"
| 81 || July 7 || Tigers || 7:10pm || 1–2 || Brieske (2–6) || Cease (7–4) || Soto (17) || 21,876 || 39–42 || L1
|- style="background:#fbb;"
| 82 || July 8 || Tigers || 7:10pm || 5–7 || Skubal (6–7) || Giolito (5–5) || Fulmer (2) || 29,215 || 39–43 || L2
|- style="background:#bfb;"
| 83 || July 9 || Tigers || 1:10pm || 8–0 || Cueto (3–4) || Hill (1–1) || — || 29,215 || 40–43 || W1
|- style="background:#bfb;"
| 84 || July 10 || Tigers || 1:10pm || 4–2 || Graveman (3–1) || Fulmer (2–3) || Hendriks (17) ||  31,072 || 41–43 || W2
|- style="background:#fbb;"
| 85 || July 11 || @ Guardians || 6:10pm || 4–8 || Quantrill (5–5) || Lynn (1–2) || — || 13,655 || 41–44 || L1
|- style="background:#fbb;" 
| 86 || July 12  || @ Guardians || 1:10pm || 1–4 || Bieber (4–5) || Martin (1–3) || — || 11,342 || 41–45 || L2
|- style="background:#bfb;"
| 87 || July 12  || @ Guardians || 6:10pm || 7–0 || Cease (8–4) || Pilkington (1–2) || — || 11,750 || 42–45 || W1
|- style="background:#bfb;"
| 88 || July 13 || @ Guardians || 6:10pm || 2–1 || Giolito (6–5) || Hentges (2–2) || Hendriks (18) || 13,987 || 43–45 || W2
|- style="background:#bfb;"
| 89 || July 14 || @ Twins || 6:40pm || 12–2 || Cueto (4–4) || Gray (4–3) || — || 26,907 || 44–45 || W3
|- style="background:#bfb;"
| 90 || July 15 || @ Twins || 7:10pm || 6–2 || Kopech (3–6) || Pagán (3–4) || — || 27,021 || 45–45 || W4
|- style="background:#fbb;"
| 91 || July 16 || @ Twins || 1:10pm || 3–6 || Bundy (6–4) || Lynn (1–3) || Durán (6) || 28,514 || 45–46 || L1
|- style="background:#bfb;"
| 92 || July 17 || @ Twins || 1:10pm || 11–0 || Cease (9–4) || Archer (2–4) || — || 23,225 || 46–46 || W1
|-style=background:#bbbfff
|| — || July 19 || colspan="10"|92nd All-Star Game in Los Angeles, CA
|- style="background:#fbb;"
| 93 || July 22 || Guardians || 7:10pm || 2–8 || Quantrill (7–5) || Giolito (6–6) || — || 31,379 || 46–47 || L1
|- style="background:#fbb;"
| 94 || July 23  || Guardians || 12:10pm || 4–7 || Stephan (4–3) || Hendriks (1–3) || Clase (20) || 18,518 || 46–48 || L2
|- style="background:#bfb;"
| 95 || July 23  || Guardians || 6:15pm || 5–4 || Kelly (1–2) || Shaw (4–2) || Foster (1) || 26,329 || 47–48 || W1
|- style="background:#bfb;"
| 96 || July 24 || Guardians || 1:10pm || 6–3 || Cease (10–4) || Bieber (4–6) || — || 30,831 || 48–48 || W2
|- style="background:#bfb;"
| 97 || July 26 || @ Rockies || 7:40pm || 2–1 || Kopech (4–6) || Márquez (6–8) || Hendriks (19) || 40,233 || 49–48 || W3
|- style="background:#fbb;"
| 98 || July 27 || @ Rockies || 2:10pm || 5–6 || Stephenson (2–1) || Graveman (3–2) || — || 30,731 || 49–49 || L1
|- style="background:#fbb;"
| 99 || July 29 || Athletics || 7:10pm || 3–7 || Kaprielian (2–5) || Lynn (1–4) || — || 28,503 || 49–50 || L2
|- style="background:#bfb;"
| 100 || July 30 || Athletics || 6:15pm || 3–2 || Hendriks (2–3) || Jackson (2–3) || — || 28,142 || 50–50 || W1
|- style="background:#bfb;"
| 101 || July 31 || Athletics || 1:10pm || 4–1 || Cease (11–4) || Oller (1–4) || Hendriks (20) || 30,028 || 51–50 || W2
|-
 
 
|- style="background:#fbb;"
| 102 || August 1 || Royals || 7:10pm || 1–2 || Lynch (4–7) || Kopech (4–7) || Barlow (17) || 17,500 || 51–51 || L1
|- style="background:#bfb;"
| 103 || August 2 || Royals || 7:10pm || 9–2 || Giolito (7–6) || Keller (5–12) || — || 24,361 || 52–51 || W1
|- style="background:#bfb;" 
| 104 || August 3 || Royals || 1:10pm || 4–1 || Lynn (2–4) || Singer (4–4) || Hendriks (21) || 19,753 || 53–51 || W2
|- style="background:#fbb;" 
| 105 || August 4 || @ Rangers || 7:05pm || 2–3 || Burke (6–2) || Cueto (4–5) || Hernández (2) || 20,972 || 53–52 || L1
|- style="background:#bfb;"
| 106 || August 5 || @ Rangers || 7:05pm || 2–1 || Cease (12–4) || Otto (4–8) || Hendriks (22) || 25,470 || 54–52 || W1
|- style="background:#fbb;"
| 107 || August 6 || @ Rangers || 6:05pm || 0–8 || Dunning (2–6) || Kopech (4–8) || — || 38,275 || 54–53 || L1
|- style="background:#bfb;"
| 108 || August 7 || @ Rangers || 1:35pm || 8–2 || Giolito (8–6) || Howard (2–4) || — || 29,579 || 55–53 || W1
|- style="background:#fbb;"
| 109 || August 9  || @ Royals || 4:10pm || 2–4 || Singer (5–4) || Lynn (2–5) || Cuas (1) ||  || 55–54 || L1
|- style="background:#bfb;" 
| 110 || August 9  || @ Royals || 6:30pm || 3–2 || Martin (2–3) || Heasley (1–7) || Hendriks (23) || 12,700 || 56–54 || W1
|- style="background:#fbb;"
| 111 || August 10 || @ Royals || 7:10pm || 3–8 || Staumont (3–1) || Diekman (5–2) || — || 15,463 || 56–55 || L1
|- style="background:#fbb;"
| 112 || August 11 || @ Royals || 1:10pm || 3–5 || Greinke (4–7) || Cease (12–5) || Barlow (18) || 10,009 || 56–56 || L2
|- style="background:#bfb;" 
| 113 || August 12 || Tigers || 6:10pm || 2–0 || López (5–2) || Lange (4–3) || Hendriks (24) || 33,015 || 57–56 || W1
|- style="background:#bfb;"
| 114 || August 13 || Tigers || 6:10pm || 6–4 || Giolito (9–6) || Jiménez (3–2) || Hendriks (25) || 29,458 || 58–56 || W2
|- style="background:#bfb;"
| 115 || August 14 || Tigers || 1:10pm || 5–3 || Lynn (3–5) || Alexander (2–7) || Graveman (6) || 32,154 || 59–56 || W3
|- style="background:#bfb;"
| 116 || August 15 || Astros || 7:10pm || 4–2 || Cueto (5–5) || Montero (4–2) || Hendriks (26) || 18,205 || 60–56 || W4
|- style="background:#bfb;"
| 117 || August 16 || Astros || 7:10pm || 4–3 || Lambert (1–2) || Neris (4–4) || Hendriks (27) || 23,476 || 61–56 || W5
|- style="background:#fbb;"
| 118 || August 17 || Astros || 7:10pm || 2–3 || Valdez (12–4) || Kopech (4–9) || Pressly (24) || 24,671 || 61–57 || L1
|- style="background:#fbb;"
| 119 || August 18 || Astros || 1:10pm || 5–21 || García (10–8) || Giolito (9–7) || — || 24,407 || 61–58 || L2
|- style="background:#fbb;"
| 120 || August 19 || @ Guardians || 6:10pm || 2–5 || McKenzie (9–9) || López (5–3) || Clase (28) || 25,521 || 61–59 || L3
|- style="background:#bfb;"
| 121 || August 20 || @ Guardians || 6:10pm || 2–0 || Cueto (6–5) || Bieber (8–7) || Hendriks (28) || 26,179 || 62–59 || W1
|- style="background:#bbb;"
| — || August 21 || @ Guardians || 12:40pm || colspan=7 | Postponed (Inclement weather, Makeup September 15)
|- style="background:#fbb;"
| 122 || August 22 || @ Royals || 7:10pm || 4–6 || Garrett (3–1) || Kelly (1–3) || Barlow (20) || 8,471 || 62–60 || L1
|- style="background:#fbb;"
| 123 || August 23 || @ Orioles || 6:05pm || 3–5 || Voth (4–1) || Cease (12–6) || Bautista (9) || 12,954 || 62–61 || L2
|- style="background:#bfb;"
| 124 || August 24 || @ Orioles || 6:05pm || 5–3 || Giolito (10–7) || Watkins (4–4) || — || 12,565 || 63–61 || W1
|- style="background:#fbb;"
| 125 || August 25 || @ Orioles || 6:05pm || 3–4  || Bautista (4–3) || Diekman (5–3) || — || 13,905 || 63–62 || L1
|- style="background:#fbb;"
| 126 || August 26 || Diamondbacks || 7:10pm || 2–7 || Henry (3–2) || Cueto (6–6) || — || 33,054 || 63–63 || L2
|- style="background:#fbb;" 
| 127 || August 27 || Diamondbacks || 6:10pm || 5–10 || Kelly (11–5) || Martin (2–4) || — || 25,837 || 63–64 || L3
|- style="background:#fbb;"
| 128 || August 28 || Diamondbacks || 1:10pm || 2–3 || Ramirez (5–4) || Graveman (3–3) || Kennedy (9) || 29,781 || 63–65 || L4
|- style="background:#fbb;" 
| 129 || August 30 || Royals || 7:10pm || 7–9 || Cuas (3–2) || Giolito (10–8) || — || 17,130 || 63–66 || L5
|- style="background:#bfb;" 
| 130 || August 31 || Royals || 7:10pm || 4–2 || Lynn (4–5) || Bubic (2–10) || Hendriks (29) || 17,168 || 64–66 || W1
|-
 
 
|- style="background:#bfb;"
| 131 || September 1 || Royals || 1:10pm || 7–1 || Cueto (7–6) || Mengden (0–1) || — || 15,257 || 65–66 || W2
|- style="background:#bfb;" 
| 132 || September 2 || Twins || 7:10pm || 4–3 || Hendriks (3–3) || López (4–7) || — || 24,818 || 66–66 || W3
|- style="background:#bfb;" 
| 133 || September 3 || Twins || 6:10pm || 13–0 || Cease (13–6) || Mahle (6–8) || — || 31,655 || 67–66 || W4
|- style="background:#fbb;" 
| 134 || September 4 || Twins || 1:10pm || 1–5 || Bundy (8–6) || Giolito (10–9) || — || 32,305 || 67–67 || L1
|- style="background:#bfb;" 
| 135 || September 5 || @ Mariners || 5:40pm || 3–2 || Lynn (5–5) || Gonzales (10–13) || Hendriks (30) || 37,109 || 68–67 || W1
|- style="background:#fbb;" 
| 136 || September 6 || @ Mariners || 8:40pm || 0–3 || Gilbert (12–5) || Cueto (7–7) || Sewald (18) || 17,958 || 68–68 || L1
|- style="background:#bfb;"
| 137 || September 7 || @ Mariners || 3:10pm || 9–6 || Bummer (1–1) || Castillo (7–3) || Hendriks (31) || 15,264 || 69–68 || W1
|- style="background:#bfb;" 
| 138 || September 8 || @ Athletics || 8:40pm || 14–2 || Cease (14–6) || Sears (5–2) || — || 4,591 || 70–68 || W2
|- style="background:#bfb;"
| 139 || September 9 || @ Athletics || 8:40pm || 5–3 || Bummer (2–1) || Puk (3–2) || Hendriks (32) || 11,494 || 71–68 || W3
|- style="background:#bfb;" 
| 140 || September 10 || @ Athletics || 3:07pm || 10–2 || Lynn (6–5) || Martínez (4–4) || — || 11,107 || 72–68 || W4
|- style="background:#fbb;"
| 141 || September 11 || @ Athletics || 3:07pm || 3–10 || Irvin (8–11) || Cueto (7–8) || — || 11,701 || 72–69 || L1
|- style="background:#bfb;" 
| 142 || September 13 || Rockies || 7:10pm || 4–2 || Kopech (5–9) || Kuhl (6–9) || Hendriks (33) || 23,606 || 73–69 || W1
|- style="background:#fbb;" 
| 143 || September 14 || Rockies || 1:10pm || 0–3 || Freeland (9–9) || Cease (14–7) || Bard (30) || 16,654 || 73–70 || L1
|- style="background:#bfb;" 
| 144 || September 15 || @ Guardians || 12:10pm || 8–2 || Lynn (7–5) || Gaddis (0–2) || — || 11,186 || 74–70 || W1
|- style="background:#fbb;"
| 145 || September 16 || @ Tigers || 6:10pm || 2–3  || Lange (5–4) || Hendriks (3–4) || — || 16,335 || 74–71 || L1
|- style="background:#bfb;"
| 146 || September 17 || @ Tigers || 5:10pm || 4–3  || Hendriks (4–4) || Soto (2–9) || Bummer (2) || 17,579 || 75–71 || W1
|- style="background:#bfb;"
| 147 || September 18 || @ Tigers || 12:10pm || 11–5 || Banks (2–0) || Hutchison (2–9) || — || 14,435 || 76–71 || W2
|- style="background:#fbb;" 
| 148 || September 20 || Guardians || 7:10pm || 7–10  || Clase (3–4) || Diekman (5–4) || — || 23,242 || 76–72 || L1
|- style="background:#fbb;" 
| 149 || September 21 || Guardians || 7:10pm || 2–8 || McKenzie (11–11) || Lynn (7–6) || — || 22,606 || 76–73 || L2
|-style="background:#fbb;"
| 150 || September 22 || Guardians || 7:10pm || 2–4 || Bieber (12–8) || Cueto (7–9) || Clase (37) || 23,395 || 76–74 || L3
|- style="background:#fbb;" 
| 151 || September 23 || Tigers || 7:10pm || 3–5 || Rodríguez (4–5) || López (5–4) || Soto (27) || 33.257 || 76–75 || L4
|- style="background:#fbb;"
| 152 || September 24 || Tigers || 6:10pm || 2–7 || Hutchison (3–9) || Martin (2–5) || — || 36,177 || 76–76 || L5
|- style="background:#fbb;" 
| 153 || September 25 || Tigers || 1:10pm || 1–4 || Chafin (2–3) || Graveman (3–4) || Soto (28) || 33,549 || 76–77 || L6
|- style="background:#fbb;" 
| 154 || September 27 || @ Twins || 6:40pm || 0–4 || Ober (2–3) || Lynn (7–7) || — || 23,647 || 76–78 || L7
|- style="background:#fbb;" 
| 155 || September 28 || @ Twins || 6:40pm || 4–8 || Thielbar (4–2) || Cueto (7–10) || — || 22,332 || 76–79 || L8
|- style="background:#bfb;" 
| 156 || September 29 || @ Twins || 12:10pm || 4–3 || López (6–4) || Thielbar (4–3) || Hendriks (34) || 23,397 || 77–79 || W1
|- style="background:#bfb;"
| 157 || September 30 || @ Padres || 8:40pm || 3–1 || Martin (3–5) || Darvish (16–8) || Hendriks (35) || 37,490 || 78–79 || W2
|-
 
 
|- style="background:#fbb;"
| 158 || October 1 || @ Padres || 7:40pm || 2–5 || Clevinger (7–7) || Cease (14–8) || Hader (35) || 38,114 || 78–80 || L1
|- style="background:#bfb;"
| 159 || October 2 || @ Padres || 3:10pm || 2–1 || Lynn (8–7) || Snell (8–10) || Hendriks (36) || 41,407 || 79–80 || W1
|- style="background:#bfb;"
| 160 || October 3 || Twins || 7:10pm || 3–2 || Cueto (8–10) || Jax (7–4) || Hendriks (37) || 22,891 || 80–80 || W2
|- style="background:#bfb;" 
| 161 || October 4 || Twins || 7:10pm || 8–3 || Giolito (11–9) || Winder (4–6) || — || 24,884 || 81–80 || W3
|- style="background:#fbb;" 
| 162 || October 5 || Twins || 3:10pm || 1–10 || Varland (1–2) || Martin (3–5) || Sands (1) || 18,918 || 81–81 || L1
|-

|- style="text-align:center;"
| Legend:       = Win       = Loss       = PostponementBold = White Sox team member

Statistics

Batting 
(Final statistics)
(Team leaders in BOLD)
Note: G = Games played; AB = At bats; R = Runs; H = Hits; 2B = Doubles; 3B = Triples; HR = Home runs; RBI = Runs batted in; SB = Stolen bases; BB = Walks; K = Strikeouts; Avg. = Batting average; OBP = On Base Percentage; SLG = Slugging Percentage; TB = Total Bases

Source

Pitching 
Team leaders in BOLD
Note: W = Wins; L = Losses; ERA = Earned run average; WHIP = Walks plus hits per inning pitched; G = Games pitched; GS = Games started; SV = Saves; IP = Innings pitched; H = Hits allowed; R = Runs allowed; ER = Earned runs allowed; BB = Walks allowed; K = Strikeouts

Source

Farm system

Awards and honors 
Dylan Cease was the recipient of the American League Pitcher of the Month Award for the month of June. Cease posted a 2–1 record in the month of June as a starter, with a 0.33 ERA in 27.1 innings pitched, 45 strikeouts, and an opponent batting average of .192. Cease became the first White Sox pitcher to earn the honor since Lucas Giolito back in May 2019. Cease would then go on to win Pitcher of the Month again in the month of July after recording a 5–1 record, striking out 40 batters in 35.2 innings pitched, and allowing only three earned runs. It was the first time ever a White Sox pitcher won the award in back-to-back months, and the first time any pitcher in Major League Baseball accomplished such a feat since Jack Flaherty in August and September 2019. At the end of the season, Cease was named as a Cy Young Award finalist after Cease posted a 14–8 record in 32 starts with an ERA of 2.20 in 184 innings while striking out a career high 227 batters. 

Johnny Cueto earned American League Player of the Week honors for the period of August 15 to August 21. Cueto went 2-0 as a starter that week while posting a 0.54 ERA in 16 2/3 innings of work.

On June 30, Tim Anderson was announced as one of the two finalists for the starting American League shortstop position in Major League Baseball's 2022 All-Star Game fan voting. Anderson finished as one of the two top vote-getters in that position, alongside Bo Bichette of the Toronto Blue Jays. Anderson defeated Bichette in the final voting on July 8, becoming the first White Sox shortstop to earn a starting spot at the All-Star Game since Luis Aparicio in 1970.

At the end of the season, José Abreu was named a finalist for the American League Silver Slugger Award. Abreu posted a .304 batting average in 2022, which was better than all the other first basemen finalists from the American League. Dylan Cease finished second in the American League Cy Young Award voting, behind only Justin Verlander of the Houston Astros.  It was the highest finish in the Cy Young voting by a White Sox pitcher since Esteban Loaiza finished second place in 2003.

References

External links
2022 Chicago White Sox season at Baseball Reference
2022 Chicago White Sox season Official Site
2022 Chicago White Sox season at ESPN

Chicago White Sox seasons
Chicago White Sox
White Sox
White Sox